The loosely defined category of S1 MP3 players is comprised by a large amount of then-inexpensive handheld digital audio players. The players were mainly widespread around 2005–2006 but the series continued for years afterwards, blurring into that of so-called "MP4 players" employing S1 and competing architectures.

Despite being primarily defined by the use of a system-on-a-chip of one of the Actions brands usually of the ATJ20xx series and some common core features, S1 products vary widely in software and hardware as well as design (including lookalikes and even counterfeits of other players), leading to a jumble of hard to identify internal designs, all employing non-mutually-interchangeable firmwares.

Capabilities

 MP1, MP2, MP3 and WMA playback
 WMA DRM support on a small number of models
 Ogg Vorbis support on a small number of models mostly made after 2005, though this is not typically listed on the player's packaging and may come with drawbacks (such as lower maximum volume, decreased battery life or an inability to read ID tags).
 Acts as a USB mass storage device when connected to a computer: can be used as a general purpose flash drive, and does not require proprietary software to load music.
 Memory capacities between 64 MB and 32 GB.
As with other forms of low-cost flash storage, some unscrupulous manufacturers resort to "flash fraud" - configuring the reported capacity to be higher than that of the actual storage, resulting in corruption due to wrap-around when the real size is exceeded in use.
 Powered by a AAA battery or a built-in rechargeable battery which charges via USB host connection. May be operable on USB power without batteries.
 8-bit Z80 CPU core with on-chip Debug Support Unit (runs at typically 24.576 MHz, up to 60 MHz — software-controlled).
 24-bit DSP with on-chip DSU.
 Firmware installation by in-system programming over USB, via the proprietary ADFU protocol.

Some models have additional features, such as:
 FM radio (requiring an additional receiver, such as the Philips TEA5756).
 Graphic equalizer presets.
 Recording via built-in microphone or FM radio in ADPCM WAV (32 kbit/s mono or 64k bps stereo; using FFmpeg codec named adpcm_ima_wav), ACT (8 kbit/s) or VOR (32 or 8 kbit/s) formats, and ability to play back these files locally or via Windows Media Player when connected as an MSC device.
 Basic telephone number list viewer (using a proprietary database format).
 ID3 tag display.
 Ability to display lyrics in files with extension .lrc.
 Some newer players have a slot for SD/MMC cards of capacities from 32 MB to 4 GB.
 Firmware upgrade tool for Windows.
 Logo customization via Chinese-language software or firmware hacks.

Software utilities
Available utilities for Microsoft Windows include an ACT to WAV file converter (for files recorded on the device), a basic desktop editor to enter contact details for the device's phone book function and device drivers for Windows 98.  An 8 cm CD-ROM containing some or all of these is included with some versions of the device.

There are also tools developed by individuals under the Open-Source license, such as s1res ans s1clone that allow the consumer to modify its device by changing bitmaps and text. By using decompilers, it is possible to add and replace features of the device, steps that were described on the s1mp3.org wiki page.

Firmware update issues
The firmware used in various S1 MP3 players differs significantly, but this is not widely understood. Problems have arisen as consumers have attempted to upgrade their players using incompatible firmware with a higher version number.  This can damage the players almost permanently. However, a 'dead' player can sometimes be recovered by opening it, shorting some pins and uploading a full firmware from the PC.

Guides on recovering the players were available on a unofficial website s1mp3.org that is offline since 2019.

Example models and brands
The following are brand names in alphabetical order. Due to common mold specifications of the player type, this list will never be complete.

 Atak M971, M972
 Cat — Not to be confused with Caterpillar Inc.
 Centon
 Coby
 Daewoo International MP3 Players
 Delstar
 Denver Electronics (Denmark)
 DIGIQuest DMTF17
 dnt
 DSE MP3/WMA Players (A5384: 2GB version)
 Element Electronics
 ePro (Digital MP3 Player)
 Explay c300
 Foehn & Hirsch MA588
 Foston
 Gigamax
 Hip Street 2GB
 I-Spirit
 InnoAX iMX-120
 INOVIX IMP-97 (and other models)
 Invion
 JFF Nano (Digital MP3/4 Player)
 Kaiomy
 Lark Smile
 LASER (badged as generic, no model name)
 LG UP3# (also styled as UP3-SHARP) — Uses the FAT32 filesystem, supports MP3, WMA (including MS-DRM), ASF and OGG audio formats. Has a built-in USB-rechargeable battery. The detailed FAQ also refers to firmware updates from the LG website.
 Mach Trio 2 GB
 MaxSpeed
 Medion TEVION 1GB Sports MP3 player - (Smart Group) Identifies as "Productor Wilson Co. Ltd." - Version 3.5.35. (Supports Ogg Vorbis)
 Medion TEVION 1GB/2GB MP4 player - (fascin8) - Firmware Version 9.1.51.0005
 Mithus (Digital MP3 Player)

 MPMan MP-F62, MP-F63 and many other models
 Mustek (Taiwan) (model V100C) — While various areas of Mustek's website do show that Mustek has had MP3 players in its lineup, then the V100C model cannot be found there.
 Nashi
 NEO Electronics (Bulgaria)
 Nextar MA99T
 Odys
 OrangeCool
 Orb A3188
 Orient HN500
 Orient MP08, MP09
 Orite EMP-735
 Pocket-Media
 Power Up!
 SanDisk SanDisk
 Sansun
 SchaubLorenz
 Sornia
 Sqmy, Soni (fake Sony)
 Stone White / Stone Black (1Gb/2Gb). Produced by Compark
 Sumvision M18 (256MB/512MG/1GB/2GB/4GB models in different colors)
 SupportPlus
 Tamashi KXB256 / KXB512 / KXB1024
 Technisat MP3-Player 256MB
 Titan M022
 Typhoon
 UE-Technology
 Visual Land V-BOP VL807] series (supports Ogg Vorbis)
 X-View
 Xiron
 Z6 Zeutronics (Digital M3/MP4 Player)
 Zepo m15-1GB-SB0307

There are also several models which carry no brand name or model number on the device or packaging, and a few sold under counterfeit trademarks such as Sony, Samsung, iPod, and others that use the same spelling in their brand name yet different brand styling, with inverse effect to established brands that offer similar or unrelated products.

Notes

References

Digital audio players